Alfred Sisley (1839–1899) was a French impressionist painter of English origin.

Sisley may also refer to:

Tomer Sisley (born 1974), an Israeli French humorist and actor
6675 Sisley, a main-belt asteroid
Sisley Volley, a professional volleyball team based in Belluno, Italy
Sue Sisley, an American psychiatrist
Sisley, a fashion brand, owned by the Benetton Group established in 1974
Sisley Choi, (born 1991) a Hong Kong TVB actress
Sisley (company), a French skin care and perfume brand